Back to the World may refer to:

 Back to the World (Curtis Mayfield album)
 Back to the World (Dennis DeYoung album)
 Back to the World (Street Dogs album)
 Back to the World (Tevin Campbell album)
 "Back to the World" (song), a song from the Tevin Campbell album